The Men's 1500m athletics events for the 2016 Summer Paralympics took place at the Estádio Olímpico João Havelange from 8 to 17 September. A total of six events were contested over this distance for eight different classifications.

Schedule

Medal summary

Results

T11

18:05 13 September 2016:

T13

Competed 11 September 2016 at 23:32.

T20

 
There were no heats in this event. The final was competed at 10:58 on 13 September 2016:

T37

 
There were no heats in this event. The final was competed 11 September 2016 at 16:59.

T38

 
19:19 10 September 2016:

T46

 
18:20 16 September 2016:

T52

10:24 15 September 2016:

T54

18:22 13 September 2016:

References

Athletics at the 2016 Summer Paralympics
2016 in men's athletics